The 1999 Benue State gubernatorial election occurred in Nigeria on January 9, 1999. The PDP nominee George Akume won the election, defeating the APP candidate.

George Akume defeated Mike Mku and others to win the PDP nomination at the primary election. His running mate was Ogiri Ajene.

Electoral system
The Governor of Benue State is elected using the plurality voting system.

Results
PDP's George Akume emerged winner in the contest.

The total number of registered voters in the state for the election was 1,806,121. However, 1,813,000 were previously issued voting cards in the state.

References 

Benue State gubernatorial elections
Benue State gubernatorial election
Benue State gubernatorial election